Senator Farnham may refer to:

Nichi Farnham (born 1963), Maine State Senate
Roswell Farnham (1827–1903), Vermont State Senate